Asphalt Ballet is the debut album by American rock band Asphalt Ballet.  The album was released in 1991 by Virgin Records.  The songs Soul Survive and "Tuesday's Rain"  had minor attention on the radio and MTV, but the album was largely ignored.

Reception
The Allmusic review by Vincent Reffries awarded the album 2 stars stating "Judging from this debut, Asphalt Ballet couldn't muster enough confidence or conviction to fill the leather boots of their bad-boy idols.".

Track listing

Personnel 
 Gary Jeffries - Vocals and harmonica
 Terry Phillips - Bass
 Julius Ulrich - Guitar
 Danny Clarke - Guitar
 Mikki Kiner - Drums

Additional personnel
 Charles Judge - Keyboards
 Greg Edward - Percussion, keyboards, vocals
 Debby Holiday - Vocals
 Jeff Daniel - Vocals
 Daniel O'Brien - Vocals
 Rick Palombi - Vocals
 Jimmy Z - Saxophone
 Dan Fornero - Trumpet
 Art Velasco - Trombone

References 

1991 debut albums
Asphalt Ballet albums
Virgin Records albums